Menton is a railway station located in Menton, Alpes-Maritimes, southeastern France. The station was opened in 1869 and is located on the Marseille–Ventimiglia railway. The train services are operated by SNCF.

Train services
The station is served by the following service(s):
High speed services (TGV) Paris - Cannes - Nice - Monaco - Menton
Local services (TER Provence-Alpes-Côte-d'Azur) Grasse/Mandelieu - Cannes - Nice - Monaco - Ventimiglia

References

TER Provence-Alpes-Côte-d'Azur
Railway stations in France opened in 1869
Railway stations in Alpes-Maritimes